Rangdi Wetterhus Krogstad (born 5 March 1966) is a Norwegian politician for the Conservative Party.

She served as a deputy representative to the Parliament of Norway from Hedmark during the terms 2001–2005 and 2013–2017. She resides in Ringsaker and has been active in local politics.

References

1966 births
Living people
People from Ringsaker
Deputy members of the Storting
Conservative Party (Norway) politicians
Hedmark politicians
Women members of the Storting